Korean Air Cargo Flight 6316 (KE6316/KAL6316) was a scheduled Korean Air Cargo freight flight from Shanghai to Seoul. On 15 April 1999, the McDonnell Douglas MD-11F operating the route, registered as HL7373, crashed in Xinzhuang, Shanghai shortly after taking off from Hongqiao Airport, killing all 3 crew on board, along with 5 on the ground.

Accident
Loaded with 86 tons of cargo, the MD-11F operating Flight 6316 took off from Shanghai Hongqiao Airport at around 4:00 pm. The flight crew consisted of Captain Hong Sung-sil (54), First Officer Park Bon-suk (35), and flight engineer Park Byong-ki (48). After taking off, the MD-11F received clearance to climb to  after the first officer contacted Shanghai Departure.

The aircraft impacted the ground and exploded. Along with the 3 South Korean crew on board, 2 pupils and 3 migrant workers on the ground also perished. The crash was recorded by the nearby Shanghai Earthquake Administration which indicated that the impact forces had generated an equivalent of a 1.6 magnitude earthquake.

Aircraft
The aircraft operated Flight 6316 was a McDonnell Douglas MD-11 freighter with the registration HL7373 and S/N 48409, powered by three Pratt & Whitney PW4460 engines. Built-in February 1992, this aircraft was delivered to Korean Air on March 24, 1992. In 1996, the aircraft was converted to a freighter.

Investigation
On April 27, 1999, the primary investigation revealed no evidence of an explosion or mechanical failure before the impact.

In almost all countries, aviation altitudes are measured in feet in compliance with the ICAO convention.
Only China, Russia, North Korea, and some nearby countries use metres.

See also

Korean Air incidents and accidents
National Airlines Flight 102 – also crashed shortly after takeoff.
Avient Aviation Flight 324 – another air disaster occurred in Shanghai, also involving an MD-11F.
Air China Flight 129 – occurred in Busan three years after the Shanghai crash.
Korean Air Cargo Flight 8509 – another Korean Air Cargo plane that crashed shortly after takeoff from London Stansted Airport eight months after the Shanghai crash.
Air Canada Flight 143 – another aviation incident caused by the confusion between Metric and Imperial measurements

Footnotes

References

External links

PlaneCrashInfo.Com – Entry on KE6316


"Loss: Korean Air Boeing MD-11F – HL-7373" (Archive Alternate archive). Flight International. 15 April 1999.

Accidents and incidents involving cargo aircraft
Aviation accidents and incidents in 1999
Aviation accidents and incidents in China
1999 disasters in China
6316
Airliner accidents and incidents caused by pilot error
Accidents and incidents involving the McDonnell Douglas MD-11
1990s in Shanghai
April 1999 events in Asia